How to Sell a Haunted House is a 2023 horror novel by American author Grady Hendrix. The book was first published on January 17, 2023.

Synopsis 
The publisher's book synopsis reads:

Development 
Hendrix began writing the novel during the COVID-19 pandemic, as "whether it’s around a campfire, at a sleepover, or alone by ourselves on the couch, there’s nothing more comforting than a haunted house story." He chose to center the story around family due to the impact family has on everyone's lives. Hendrix set the story in his hometown, which he had used for his novels My Best Friend’s Exorcism and The Southern Book Club’s Guide to Slaying Vampires, noting that this would be the last novel to use this setting.

Release 
How to Sell a Haunted House was published in hardback and ebook formats on January 17, 2023 through Berkeley Books. An audiobook adaptation narrated by Jay and Mikhaila Aaseng was released simultaneously through Penguin Audio.

Reception 
Critical reception for the book has been positive. In a review for The New York Times, Danielle Trussoni states that "by weaving violence, family trauma and humor, Hendrix creates a texture that engages the reader emotionally and viscerally." Lee Mandelo of Tor.com noted that, "The novel reminded me of the frenetic, compulsive energy that propelled me through pulp horror paperbacks as a kid, except cleverly updated for a contemporary adult audience." NPR called it "campy, unexpectedly deep — and as creepy as the dead eyes of a puppet at midnight in a gloomy room — How to Sell a Haunted House is a tense, dark novel."

References

External links
 

2020s horror novels
Books by Grady Hendrix
Berkley Books books